Promptuarium Iconum Insigniorum (the full title of which is Prima pars Promptuarii iconum insigniorum à seculo hominum, subiectis eorum vitis, per compendium ex probatissimis autoribus desumptis.) is an iconographic collection of wood engravings authored and published by French humanist, numismatist, and bookseller-printer Guillaume Rouillé, in three languages in 1553, in Lyon, France.

The book contains 828 portraits of mythical, historical, and quasi-historical figures, designed as medals and accompanied by brief biographies, in chronological order beginning with portraits of Adam and Eve. The contents are divided into two parts—before and after the birth of Christ—but usually bound into one book. The book does not mention the engraver's name; the portraits are typically attributed, however, to Piedmontese engraver . Julian Sharman, the 19th-century author of The Library of Mary Queen of Scots, noted that this work had been "pronounced to be one of the marvels of early wood-engraving."

Iconographic basis 

In his preface, Rouillé humorously states that, in order not to be accused for having spread forgeries or counterfeit money to the public, he included fictitious images of individuals who were supposed to have lived before the biblical account of the Flood or the invention of the art of painting and engraving. He admits that these portraits were drawn with the help of imagination, yet in accordance with the characteristics of the individual's deeds, customs, personality, and the region they were said to be from; likewise for the images of historical figures whose attested iconographic traces did not exist. As for the rest, the portraits were based on paintings and numismatic, sigillographic, or intaglio collections Rouillé and the engraver had access to. 

The book does not disclose the portrait engraver's identity; however, 19th-century Lyonese bibliographer  attributed the portraits to Georges Reverdy from Piedmont, whose engraving skills he praised. Either Reverdy modeled some of the engravings after drawings and paintings of Dutch painter Corneille de Lyon (also known as Corneille de La Haye), or Reverdy and Corneille worked jointly, for the artistic style in some of the portraits very closely matches Corneille's.

Contents 

The work is chronologically divided into two parts based on the birth of Christ, which Rouillé placed in the 3,962th year after the biblical account of the creation of the world. The individuals who lived before Christ are grouped together in the first part, and each major event of their lives is given two dates: one in anno Mundi and the other ante Christum natum. Those born after Christ are listed in the second part, which is titled Promptuarii iconum pars secunda incipit à Christo nato, perpetuam ducens seriem ad usque Christianissimũ Francorum regem Henricum hoc nomine secundum, hodie feliciter regnantem in the initial Latin edition, which is dedicated to the French monarch. The two parts, nevertheless, are usually bound into one book.

The first part begins with Adam and Eve, followed by the patriarchs, prophets, and kings of the Old Testament, such as Abraham, Noah, Jeremiah, Nimrod, and Ahab; pagan deities and heroes like Vesta, Janus, Osiris, Romulus, and Hercules; and renowned historical figures who came before Christ did, such as Zoroaster, Solon, and Pericles. 

The second part opens with a title page depicting the Nativity and deals with the biographies of individuals from the Roman Empire, Middle Ages, and Rouillé's contemporary era: Christ himself, Judas Iscariot, Pontius Pilate, Caligula and most of the other Roman emperors, Attila of the Huns, Islamic prophet Muhammad, Charlemagne and the German emperors up to Charles V. Also included are ancient and post-classical writers and philosophers like Thales of Miletus and Dante Alighieri, and a large number of contemporary royals, such as Edward VI of England, Marguerite de Navarre, and Catherine de' Medici.

Publication history 

The book was published in Lyon, France, in 1553, in three editions simultaneously: Latin, French, and Italian. Rouillé dedicated the Latin edition to Henry II of France, the Italian edition to Catherine de' Medici, and the French edition to Marguerite de Navarre. Several subsequent editions in these languages were published in the following years. 

The Spanish translation, Promptuario de las medallas de todos las más insignes varones que ha habido desde el principio del mundo, was a work of Valencian theologian and translator . His dedication of the work, dated September 8, 1558, and written from the Université catholique de Louvain where he was a student at the time, was addressed "... al muy alto y muy poderoso señor don Carlos, por la gracia de Dios, Príncipe de las Españas", referring to Prince Carlos of Asturias, who was the eldest son and heir apparent of King Philip II of Spain. The Spanish edition was published in 1561.

Reception 

The work was a bestseller in its era. Many of the similar iconographic collections published in Europe from the mid-16th to 17th centuries referenced and copied from it, partly because Rouillé had used a variety of diverse sources and chosen individuals based on more daring criteria than what was generally accepted at the time. 

Julian Sharman, the 19th-century author of The Library of Mary Queen of Scots, judged the work to be "not one of much numismatic interest", but noted that it had been "pronounced to be one of the marvels of early wood-engraving." Art historian Ilaria Andreoli commented: "Beyond any scruples of historical, archaeological and antiquarian exactitude and precision, Rouillé's ambition is (...) to speak to the eyes (...) thanks to which the reader will be able to peer into the features and hear them speak, as if they were actors' masks".

See also
 Roman currency

References

External links

Latin edition, Promptuarium iconum insigniorum a seculo hominum  (1533) via Google Books
French edition, Promptuaire des médailles des personnages les plus renommés... (1533) via Gallica, the digital library of the Bibliothèque nationale de France and its partners
Spanish edition, Promptuario de las medallas de todos las más insignes varones... (1561) via Google Books
Portraits of Promptuarium Iconum Insigniorum (1553) via St-Takla.org

1553 books
16th-century Latin books
French books
Iconography